Lindsay High School or  Lindsay Secondary School is a public high school located in Lindsay, Texas, in Cooke County (USA) and classified as a 2A school by the UIL. It is a part of the Lindsay Independent School District located in west central Cooke County. In 2015, the school was rated "Met Standard" by the Texas Education Agency.

Achievements
Texas Lone Star Cup Champions
2006(1A), 2007(1A), 2008(1A), 2009(1A), 2011(1A), 2012(1A)

Academics

UIL Academic Meet Champions
1992(1A), 1993(1A), 1994(1A), 1995(1A), 1998(2A), 1999(1A), 2001(1A), 2003(1A), 2004(1A), 2005(1A), 2007(1A), 2008(1A), 2009(1A), 2010(1A)

The 14 overall academic titles is the most of any high school in Texas in any classification.  Lindsay is the only school to score more than 200 points at the UIL State Academic Meet; it has done so three times (274 points in 2005, 263 points in 2007, and 280 points in 2009).  It has also held the last three records for most overall points at the state meet by any school (187 points in 2001, 274 in 2005, 280 in 2009).  The 280 points in 2009 equaled the combined total of the next five highest placing schools in Class A, and the margin between first place Lindsay and the second place Class A finisher was 204 points, a larger point total than the winning scores of any of the other conference winners.

Calculator Applications:
Individual – 2008, 2009
Team – 2009
Computer Applications – 1999 (this is an individual event only)
Current Issues and Events:
Individual – 2001, 2002
Team – 1992, 1994, 1995 (co-champion), 1996, 2001, 2002, 2003
Journalism Events (all events are individual events only; however, beginning in 2004 UIL began to recognize the school with the best overall performance in all Journalism events):
Editorial Writing – 2001, 2007
Headline Writing – 1987, 2002
News Writing – 1992, 1999
Overall Team Award – 2007
Literary Criticism:
Individual – 1996, 2000, 2005
Team – 1995, 1996, 1997, 2002, 2003
Mathematics:
Individual – 2007, 2008, 2009, 2010
Team – 1994, 2005, 2008, 2009, 2010
Number Sense:
Individual – 2005, 2008, 2009, 2010
Team – 2004, 2005, 2007, 2008, 2009, 2010
Ready Writing – 1968, 1996
Science:
Individual (overall) – 1982, 1984, 1987, 1988, 1993, 1994
Individual (biology) – 1987, 1988, 1992, 1993, 1994
Individual (chemistry) – 1987, 1994, 1995, 2009
Individual (physics) – 1988, 1992, 1993, 1994
Team – 1993, 1994, 1995, 1999, 2009
Shorthand – 1978, 1980, 1981 (now discontinued, was an individual event only)
Social Studies:
Individual – 2010
Team – 2005
Speech Events (all events are individual events except for Cross-Examination Debate; however, beginning in 2004 UIL began to recognize the school with the best overall performance in all Speech events):
Cross-Examination Team Debate – 1994, 1996, 1999
Lincoln-Douglas Debate – 1992, 2007
Extemporaneous Informative Speaking – 1995, 2006, 2007, 2008, 2009
Persuasive Speaking – 1974 (boys)
Poetry Interpretation – 2007
Prose Interpretation – 2004, 2007
Overall Team Award – 2005, 2007, 2008, 2009
Spelling and Vocabulary:
Individual – 1980, 1992, 2005
Team – 1992, 2002, 2005, 2006, 2007, 2010
Prior to the 1992-1993 school year the event was known as Spelling and Plain Writing.
One Act Play
1994(1A), 2003(1A), 2004(1A), 2005(1A), 2007(1A), 2009(1A)

Athletics
The Lindsay Knights compete in the following sports:

 Baseball
 Basketball
 Cross Country
 Football
 Golf
 Softball
 Tennis
 Track and Field
 Volleyball

State Titles

Girls Basketball - 
2007(1A/D1)
Girls Cross Country - 
2007(1A)
Boys Track - 
2005(1A), 2010(1A)
Girls Track - 
2007(1A)
Boys Golf - 
2022 (2A)

In 2009 they were Regional Champions with a record of 12-2. Lindsay had a good shot at advancing to State until four two way starters and 2 others became injured, in which the Knights were unable to overcome and lost to Albany in the State Quarter Finals.

References

External links
Lindsay ISD

Public middle schools in Texas
High schools in Cooke County, Texas
Public high schools in Texas